The Racka (pronounced  Hungarian [ˈrɒts.kɒ]) or Hortobágy Racka Sheep is a breed of sheep known for its unusual spiral-shaped horns.

The breed has been kept by Hungarians for many centuries and was once the most common variety in Hungary. Now the largest stocks are found in the Hortobágy steppes of Hungary and to a lesser extent in Caras Severin, Romania. Because of its unique features it has been exported in growing numbers to the United Kingdom, United States and France, while in its home range interest remains limited. It is a hardy, multi-purpose breed used for milking, wool and meat. Their wool is long and coarse, and appears in two general types: a cream wool with light brown faces and legs, and a black variation.

The breed's unique appearance and quiet disposition make it a desirable animal for hobby situations.

Characteristics
This breed is unique with both sexes possessing long spiraling shaped horns, which protrude almost straight upward from the top of the head.

There are two major color patterns with the Racka. The most common color is brown wool covering the heads and legs with the fiber varying in color from dark brown to light brown and white. Individuals can also be solid black. The wool tips on the black-colored sheep fades to a reddish black with exposure to sunlight and as they get older, the points of the fiber turns gray. The fiber diameter varies within this breed and generally is found to be 12 to 40 micrometres with a yield of 38% to 65%. Fleece weight must be at least  for rams. The softness and crimp of the wool would indicate its interest with hand spinners.

The rams average  in height.

The sheep were traditionally kept for both milk and meat. The fleece is coarse.

References

Sheep breeds originating in Hungary
Sheep breeds